The following lists events that happened during 1996 in Cape Verde.

Incumbents
President:
Pedro Pires
António Mascarenhas Monteiro
Prime Minister:
Carlos Veiga

Events
Municipality of São Miguel established from part of the municipality of Tarrafal on the island of Santiago
Banco Caboverdiano de Negocios established in Praia
February 18: Cape Verdean presidential election took place
October 21: CFN became ISECMAR, now part of the University of Cape Verde

Sports
CD Travadores won the Cape Verdean Football Championship

Births
2 January: Platiny Alves, footballer
5 January: Ailton César Duarte Silva, footballer
10 January: Vagner Gonçalves, footballer
8 June: Kévin Oliveira, footballer

References